Jan van Ispelen (born 12 April 1941 in Schönebeck) is a retired boxer, who was born in Germany but competed for the Netherlands. He represented Holland at the 1968 Summer Olympics, where he was defeated in the second round of the men's middleweight (– 75 kg) division by Yugoslavia's Mate Parlov.

1968 Olympic results
Below are the results of Jan van Ispelen, a middleweight boxer who competed for the Netherlands in the 1968 Mexico City Olympics:

 Round of 32: defeated Misael Vilugron (Chile) by a second-round technical knockout
 Round of 16: lost to Mate Parlov (Yugoslavia) by decision, 1-4

References
  Dutch Olympic Committee

1941 births
Living people
Olympic boxers of the Netherlands
Boxers at the 1968 Summer Olympics
People from Schönebeck
Middleweight boxers
Dutch male boxers